Polyanoye is a rural locality (a selo) in Tomichevsky Selsoviet of Belogorsky District, Amur Oblast, Russia. The population was 113 as of 2018. There are 8 streets.

Geography 
Polyanoye is located 31 km southwest of Belogorsk (the district's administrative centre) by road. Lokhvitsy is the nearest rural locality.

References 

Rural localities in Belogorsky District